Can't Stop Dancin' may refer to:

 "Can't Stop Dancin'" (Captain & Tennille song), a 1977 song 
 "Can't Stop Dancin'" (Becky G song), a 2014 song

See also
 Can't Stop Dancing, a 1999 film